The House of Iljo and Strezo Cubalevski is a historical house in Galičnik that is listed as Cultural heritage of North Macedonia. It is in ownership of one branch of the family of Cubalevski.

Family history
The Cubalevski/Cubalevci trace roots from the Kolačevci family which originates from Albania. It is said that Kolačevci moved out from Albania after the fall of Gjerg Kastrioti.

Notable members of the family 
 Kuze Cubaleski - 19th century local teacher (daskal).
 Strezo Cubaleski - local sports activist.
 Mitre Cubaleski - local sports activist.

References

External links
 National Register of objects that are cultural heritage (List updated to December 31, 2012) (In Macedonian)
 Office for Protection of Cultural Heritage (In Macedonian)

Galičnik
Cultural heritage of North Macedonia
Historic houses